Dasungezhuang Town is a town situated on the southeastern portion of Shunyi District, Beijing. It shares border with Zhang Town in its north, Machangying and Mafang Towns in its east, Gaolou Town in its south, Beiwu and Yang Towns in the west. In 2020, it was home to 23,712 residents.

Dasungezhuang was originally known as Dasonggezhuang during the Ming dynasty, which referred to the pine forest surrounding the settlement.

History

Administrative divisions 
In the year 2021, Dasungezhuang Town was composed of 39 villages:

See also 

 List of township-level divisions of Beijing

References 

Towns in Beijing
Shunyi District